The Water War is a documentary movie about the Water conflict in Mozambique. It is directed by Licínio Azevedo.

Festivals
 Festival du Réel, France
 Festival dei Popoli, Italy

Awards
 Certificate of Merit, 3rd International Environmental Film Festival South Africa, África do Sul (1997)
 Best production, Southern Africa Communications for Development Award, South Africa (1996)
 Special Jury Mention at International Environmental Film Festival, Germany (1996)
 Special Jury Mention at XXIII Jornada International de cinema e Video da Bahia, Brazil (1996)

See also
Licínio Azevedo
Water conflict

External links

Mozambican documentary films
1995 films
1995 documentary films
Documentary films about water and the environment
Portuguese-language films
Water and politics
Films directed by Licínio Azevedo